The 2010 Trans-Am Series was the 42nd season of the SCCA's Trans-Am Series. It began on May 8 and ran for ten rounds. Chevrolet nearly swept the season, with Jaguar winning the opening round at New Jersey. 2010 was also the first Trans Am season since 2002 in which an American manufacturer won the championship.

Results

Final points standings

References 

Trans-Am Series
Trans-Am